

Brooker is a locality in the Australian state of South Australia located in the state’s west on Eyre Peninsula about  west of the state capital of Adelaide and about  north-west of the municipal seat in Tumby Bay.

Brooker’s boundaries were created on 23 December 1998 and it was given the ”long established name” which is derived from the cadastral unit of the Hundred of Brooker.  It occupies all of the land in the hundred as well as some land to the immediate north in the Hundred of Nicholls.

The Cummins to Kimba branch of the Eyre Peninsula Railway passes through the south-east corner of the locality.  A site for a railway station named Moreenia is located on the branch line within the locality.

Land use within Brooker is zoned as primary production which typically consists of “agricultural production and the grazing of stock on relatively large holdings.”

The 2016 Australian census which was conducted in August 2016 reports that Brooker had a population of 76 people.

Brooker is located within the federal division of Grey, the state electoral district of Flinders and the local government area of the District Council of Tumby Bay.

References

 

Towns in South Australia
Eyre Peninsula